Markus Eino Fagervall (born 5 October 1982 in Kiruna, Norrbotten County) won Idol 2006, the third season of the Swedish version of Pop Idol. Fagervall beat Erik Segerstedt on 1 December 2006 to take the title. His first single "Everything Changes" peaked at number one on the Swedish Singles Chart. His debut album, Echo Heart, was released on 18 December the same year and has to date been certified double platinum. Prior to winning Idol, Markus was the vocalist in the progressive rock band, Liquid Scarlet.

In 2008, Fagervall was a contestant in the Swedish version of Dancing on Ice, hosted by Carolina Gynning and Carina Berg.

Early life
Fagervall was born in Kiruna to a Tornedalian father and a Finnish mother. He is fluent in both Finnish and Meänkieli.

Discography

The following is a complete discography of every album and single released by Swedish Pop/Rock music artist Markus Fagervall.

Albums

Singles

Other Charted Songs

References

External links
Official website
News article (in Swedish)
News article (in Swedish

1982 births
Living people
People from Kiruna Municipality
Idol (Swedish TV series) winners
Swedish people of Finnish descent
21st-century Swedish singers
21st-century Swedish male singers